Saint-Philbert-sur-Boissey (literally Saint-Philbert on Boissey) is a commune in the Eure department in Normandy in northern France.

Population

See also
Communes of the Eure department

References

Communes of Eure